The following is a list of governors of French Somaliland and French Territory of the Afars and the Issas from 1884 to 1977. They administered the territory on behalf of the French Republic.

List
Complete list of governors of French Somaliland:

For continuation after independence, see: List of presidents of Djibouti

See also
Djibouti
Politics of Djibouti
List of presidents of Djibouti
List of prime ministers of Djibouti
French Somaliland
French Territory of the Afars and the Issas
Lists of office-holders

Notes

Djibouti
 
French Somaliland, Governors